Mount Harif is a mountain at an elevation of  located in the Negev desert in southern Israel.

The mountain is the second highest peak in the Negev desert, after the peak of Mount Ramon. An IDF military base is situated on the mountain due to its strategic location on the border with Egypt.

Remains of a prehistoric settlement have been discovered in the past in the site. A cluster of 17 water cisterns exist approximately 5 km east of the mountain which were estimated to have been built during the reign of king Solomon, and were active apparently until the Babylonian exile. Some of the water cisterns still fill up with water during the winter seasons.

On 21 September 2012 IDF forces, whom were safeguarding civilian workers constructing the Israel–Egypt barrier, were ambushed by three heavily armed militants who opened fire at them and managed to kill one soldier and lightly injured another.

References

External links 
 מסלולי טיול – מניצנה להר חריף – תאור המסלול  - published on the website of Midreshet Ben-Gurion

Mountains of Israel